"Perfect" is a song by recorded by Canadian pop rock band Hedley for their third studio album, The Show Must Go (2009). Lead singer Jacob Hoggard co-wrote the song with David Bendeth and Dave Genn, while Bendeth co-produced the track with Brian Howes. It was first released on February 8, 2010 through Universal Music Canada as the record's third single. "Perfect" was released in the United States through Island Records on August 10, 2010 as the group's first official single in that country.

Upon release, "Perfect" reached number seven on the Canadian Hot 100, earning the band their second top-10 single from The Show Must Go. It also became their first charting entry in the US by peaking at number 25 on the Billboard Adult Pop Songs chart.

The song earned a nomination for Single of the Year at the Juno Awards of 2011. It also won a SOCAN Pop/Rock song award in 2010 for its strong radio presence and two MuchMusic Video Awards, including Video of the Year, at the 2010 ceremony.

Composition
"Perfect" is a pop rock song written by Jacob Hoggard, David Bendeth, and Dave Genn which lasts for four minutes and ten seconds. The ballad opens on a short piano riff, which is then repeated in the background during the verses. According to the sheet music published by Universal Music Publishing Group, "Perfect" is composed in the key of C major and set in common time to a moderate tempo of 76 BPM. The song follows a chord progression of Am – F – C – G – G (except for the chorus, which omits the G) and includes a vocal range of one octave and three notes, from G to C. Lyrically, the song is about a man owning up to his mistakes and vowing to try and be a better man. Hoggard told the Toronto Sun that "Perfect" represents the band "feeling confident in this new line of [more mature] music," and described the song as "a big turning point for [them]."

Awards and nominations
At the 2010 MuchMusic Video Awards, the video for "Perfect" was nominated in five categories: Video of the Year, Best Post-Production, Best Cinematography, Director of the Year (for Kyle Davison), and People's Choice (UR Fave). It won the awards for Post-Production and Video of the Year, their second win in the latter category. "Perfect" received a SOCAN Award in 2010 in the category of Pop / Rock for performing well on radio. The following year, "Perfect" was nominated for Single of the Year at the Juno Awards of 2011, but lost to Young Artists for Haiti's cover of K'naan's "Wavin' Flag". Jacob Hoggard of Hedley was one of the artists contributing to the supergroup, making him one of the recipients of the award.

Commercial performance
"Perfect" entered the Billboard Canadian Hot 100 at number 36 on the chart dated December 5, 2009. It was the week's highest-ranking debut and also notably debuted one spot above the position of their previous single, "Don't Talk to Strangers", which was the week's "airplay gainer". After reaching the top 10 in April 2010, "Perfect" peaked at number 7 on the chart dated May 8, 2010. The song reached a peak position of 5 on the Canadian Digital Songs component chart the same week.

"Perfect" is the band's first song to enter one of the US Billboard charts, debuting at number 40 on the Adult Pop Songs chart dated October 2, 2010. The song spent 20 weeks on the chart and reached a peak of 25 on the chart dated January 1, 2011.

Music video
The music video for "Perfect" was directed by Kyle Davison and Mahlon Todd Williams and premiered March 5, 2010. It alternates between performance shots – first of Hoggard alone at a piano, and later the whole band – in an all-white room and "abstract vignettes" that depict a tumultuous relationship; the latter are presented in slow motion, with images of flames or shattered glass superimposed on the scene. Toward the end of the video, Hoggard is shown dressed all in white while the female character hurls a bucketful of red paint at him. This red splatter imagery is used in the single artwork. According to Davison, the video is meant to represent "a relationship at the beginning of the end."

Charts

Weekly charts

Year-end charts

References

2009 songs
2010 singles
Hedley (band) songs
Universal Music Canada singles
Island Records singles
Songs written by Jacob Hoggard
Songs written by Dave Genn
Juno Award for Video of the Year videos
Songs written by David Bendeth
Song recordings produced by David Bendeth